Thomas Hughes VC (10 November 1885 – 4 January 1942) was a British Army soldier, and Irish recipient of the Victoria Cross, the highest and most prestigious award for gallantry in the face of the enemy that can be awarded to British and Commonwealth forces.

Biography
Hughes was born 30 May 1885 in Corravoo near Castleblayney, County Monaghan. He migrated to England in 1910 and lived at Hednesford, Staffordshire while he worked as a stable hand, and on a coal wharf at Cannock before enlisting in November 1914.

He was 31 years old, and a private in the 6th Battalion, The Connaught Rangers, British Army during the First World War when he was awarded the Victoria Cross for his action which took place during the Battle of the Somme.

On 3 September 1916 at Guillemont, France, Private Hughes was wounded in an attack but returned at once to the firing line after having his wounds dressed. Later, seeing a hostile machine-gun, he dashed out in front of his company, shot the gunner and, single-handed, captured the gun. Though again wounded, he brought back three or four prisoners.

He later achieved the rank of corporal. His wounds left him with difficulty walking and led to his being invalided out of the army in February 1918.

He returned to Ireland after the war to help run a family farm, later purchasing another farm with money locally collected for him. He suffered alcoholism and spent periods in the workhouse. He died in Carrickmacross, County Monaghan on 4 January 1942, aged 56. He never married but he had an illegitimate son, born in England.

He is buried in the cemetery attached to St Patrick's Roman Catholic church in Broomfield, near Castleblayney, in Co Monaghan.

His Victoria Cross is displayed at the National Army Museum, Chelsea, London.

References

Listed in order of publication year 
 The Register of the Victoria Cross (1981, 1988 and 1997)
 
 Ireland's VCs  (Dept of Economic Development, 1995)
 Monuments to Courage (David Harvey, 1999)
 Irish Winners of the Victoria Cross (Richard Doherty & David Truesdale, 2000)

External links
 Location of grave and VC medal (Co. Monaghan, Ireland)

1885 births
1942 deaths
Connaught Rangers soldiers
British Army personnel of World War I
Irish Battle of the Somme recipients of the Victoria Cross
People from County Monaghan
British Army recipients of the Victoria Cross
Military personnel from County Monaghan